Behind super cyclonic storms, extremely severe cyclonic storms are the second-highest classification on the India Meteorological Department (IMD)'s intensity scale. There have been 32 of them since reliable records began in 1960. The most recent extremely severe cyclonic storm was Cyclone Tauktae in the 2021 North Indian Ocean cyclone season.

Background
The North Indian Ocean tropical cyclone basin is located to the north of the Equator, and encompasses the Bay of Bengal and the Arabian Sea, between the Malay Peninsula and the Arabian Peninsula. The basin is officially monitored by the India Meteorological Department's Regional Specialized Meteorological Centre in New Delhi.

Systems

Climatology

See also

 North Indian Ocean tropical cyclone

References

NIO ESCS
Extremely severe cyclonic storms